Athippallam is a village in Vanathirayanpatti Panchayat within the Viralimalai block, Tamil Nadu, India. The population of the village is 1102 (578 Males, 524 Females).

Temples 
 Sri Ayyanar Thirukovil
 Sri Mariyamman Thirukovil
 Sri Kaliyamman Thirukovil
 Sri Chithi Vinayagar Thirukovil
 Sri Pidari Amman Thirukovil
 Sri Muniyappa Swamy Thirukovil
 Sri karuppaswamy Thirukovil

Villages in Pudukkottai district